Craig Wayne Boyd (born December 31, 1978) is an American country singer and songwriter. A native of Dallas, Texas, Boyd is based out of and resides in Nashville, Tennessee. He is best known for winning Season 7 of NBC's reality TV singing competition The Voice as a part of Blake Shelton's team.

Early life
Boyd was born on December 31, 1978, and raised in the Dallas suburb of Mesquite. He grew up influenced by gospel and country music. He played many instruments in his youth. He was also his church's choir director.

Career

Early years
Boyd moved to Nashville at the age of 25 in 2004 to pursue a career in country music. Boyd was signed to a publishing deal with EMI. He spent many years songwriting. Boyd began touring, opening for acts such as Jamey Johnson, Randy Houser, and Brantley Gilbert.

The Voice (2014)
On September 30, 2014, Boyd debuted on seventh season of The Voice. During his Blind Audition, Boyd sang "The Whiskey Ain't Workin'" by Travis Tritt and Marty Stuart.  Two coaches (Blake Shelton and Pharrell Williams) turned around. Boyd chose Blake Shelton as his coach.  During the Battle Rounds, Boyd was paired with James David Carter to sing "Wave on Wave" by Pat Green.  Coach Shelton chose Carter over Boyd, but Boyd was stolen by Coach Gwen Stefani.  In the Knockout Rounds, Boyd was paired with Anita Antoinette.  Boyd sang "Can't You See" by The Marshall Tucker Band.  Boyd lost the round, but was stolen back by Coach Shelton and advanced to the Live Playoffs.  During the Live Playoffs, Boyd sang "Some Kind of Wonderful" and was saved by the Public's votes to advance to the Top 12.
For the week of the Top 12, Boyd performed "You Look So Good in Love" by George Strait. Boyd was saved by the public's votes.
For the week of the Top 10, Boyd performed "I Walk the Line" by Johnny Cash. Boyd was saved by the public vote with his performance in the Top 10 of the iTunes Chart.
For the week of the Top Eight, Boyd performed "Take It Easy" by the Eagles. Boyd was saved by the public vote and advanced to the Top Five.
For the week of the Semifinals, Coach Shelton picked "Workin' Man Blues" by Merle Haggard for Boyd to sing and Boyd also sang "The Old Rugged Cross" which was in the iTunes Top 10. Boyd advanced to the finals.
For the week of the Finals, Boyd performed three songs. He performed "In Pictures" by Alabama as his solo song. He performed "Boots On" by Randy Houser as a duet with his coach Blake Shelton. He also performed an original song called "My Baby's Got a Smile on Her Face". The song was written for Shelton, but he decided to give it to Boyd. The song is Boyd's debut single.

Boyd was declared the winner on December 16, 2014, giving Blake Shelton's team its fourth win out of the seven Seasons. He beat out Matt McAndrew, Chris Jamison, and Damien Lawson, all three of whom were from Team Adam Levine.

Shortly after winning the show and signing with Universal Republic and Dot Records, Boyd played at the Grand Ole Opry and went on a 65 city tour.  His debut album is to be released sometime in 2015. In early May 2015, following 6 weeks of rumors, it was reported that Boyd parted ways with Dot. He tweeted that "it's called I ASK off of the label....". Boyd released one single under Dot records "My Baby’s Got A Smile On Her Face", which debuted at #1 on the Billboard Hot Country Songs before falling off that chart with a 94% drop in sales the next week.. His second single "I'm Still Here" was released to iTunes under his own imprint - Long Haul Records. The song peaked at #35 on the Billboard Digital charts.

Craig Wayne Boyd signed a new record deal with Copperline Music Group in 2017. The singer is collaborating with Reviver Entertainment Group for radio promotion and BDG/RED for distribution. Top Shelf was released on October 27 via the Copperline Music Group.

 – Studio version of performance reached the top 10 on iTunes

Discography

Albums

Studio albums

Singles

Releases from The Voice

Albums

Singles

Music videos

Notes

References

|-

Living people
American male singer-songwriters
American country singer-songwriters
People from Mesquite, Texas
The Voice (franchise) winners
Singer-songwriters from Texas
Country musicians from Texas
21st-century American male singers
21st-century American singers
1978 births